Alagi may refer to:

Ələhi, a municipality in Azerbaijan
Amba Alagi, a mountain in Ethiopia 
Italian submarine Alagi, named after the mountain
An alternative name of Allagi, Greece